Henry Aydelotte Houston (July 10, 1847 – April 5, 1925) was an American teacher, businessman and politician, from Millsboro, in Sussex County, Delaware. He was a member of the Democratic Party, who served as U. S. Representative from Delaware. "Houston" is pronounced "house-ton," unlike the city in Texas with the same spelling.

Early life and family
Houston was born in Dagsboro Hundred, Sussex County, Delaware. He attended the Newark Academy, now the University of Delaware. He lived in Missouri from 1872 until 1875, when he returned to Millsboro.

Professional and political career
After teaching school for five years, Houston engaged in mercantile pursuits, lumber manufacturing, and banking. At one time, he was a member of the Sussex County School Commission.

Houston was elected to the U.S. House of Representatives in 1902. During this term, he served in the Democratic minority in the 58th Congress. He did not seek reelection in 1904, and served one term, from March 4, 1903, until March 3, 1905, during the administration of U.S. President Theodore Roosevelt.

Death and legacy
Houston died at Milford, Delaware and is buried in the Brotherhood Cemetery at Millsboro.

Almanac
Elections are held the first Tuesday after November 1. U.S. Representatives took office March 4 and have a two-year term.

References

External links
Biographical Directory of the U.S. Congress 
Delaware's Members of Congress

The Political Graveyard

Places with more information
Delaware Historical Society; website; 505 North Market Street, Wilmington, Delaware 19801; (302) 655-7161
Hagley Museum and Library website; Barley Mill Road, Wilmington, Delaware; (302) 658-2400
University of Delaware; Library website; 181 South College Avenue, Newark, Delaware 19717; (302) 831-2965
Newark Free Library; 750 Library Ave., Newark, Delaware; (302) 731–7550.

1847 births
1925 deaths
People from Millsboro, Delaware
Burials in Sussex County, Delaware
Democratic Party members of the United States House of Representatives from Delaware